Arild Underdal (born 13 August 1946) is a Norwegian political scientist.

Career
Underdal was born in Bodø. He was professor at BI Norwegian Business School from 1984 to 1986, and was appointed professor of international politics at the University of Oslo from 1987. He served as rector of the University of Oslo from 2002 to 2006.

Underdal is a fellow of the Norwegian Academy of Science and Letters. He was decorated Commander of the Order of St. Olav in 2006.

References

1946 births
Living people
People from Bodø
Norwegian political scientists
Academic staff of BI Norwegian Business School
Academic staff of the University of Oslo
Rectors of the University of Oslo
Members of the Norwegian Academy of Science and Letters